Savencia Fromage & Dairy, named Bongrain until 2015, is a French food company specializing in the production of cheeses. Brands include Saint Agur Blue, Saint Albray, Etorki, Alouette and Pié d'Angloys.

References

External links
 

Food and drink companies of France